Antonio Georgiev (born 26 October 1997) is a Bulgarian professional footballer who plays as a midfielder for Botev Vratsa . He has represented Bulgaria at U-19 and U-21 level.

References

External links 
 

1997 births
Living people
Bulgarian footballers
Bulgaria youth international footballers
Bulgaria under-21 international footballers
PFC Ludogorets Razgrad II players
PFC Ludogorets Razgrad players
FC Botev Galabovo players
FC Tsarsko Selo Sofia players
FC Botev Vratsa players
First Professional Football League (Bulgaria) players
Association football midfielders
People from Yambol